Xinhe may refer to the following locations in China:

Counties
Xinhe County, Hebei
 Xinhe County, Xinjiang ( - formerly Toqsu County)

Communities 
Xinhe, Chengzhong, Chengzhong Subdistrict, Yingcheng, Xiaogan, Hubei

Subdistricts 
Written as "":
Xinhe Subdistrict, Qitaihe, in Xinxing District, Qitaihe, Heilongjiang
Xinhe Subdistrict, Xi'an, in Baqiao District

Written as "":
Xinhe Subdistrict, Changsha, in Kaifu District
Xinhe Subdistrict, Tianjin, in Binhai, Tianjin

Towns 
Written as "":
Toksu, Xinjiang, or Xinhe, seat of Xinhe County, Xinjiang
Xinhe, Guangxi, in Jiangzhou District, Chongzuo

Written as ""
Xinhe, Jiangxi, in Jiujiang County
Xinhe, Meihekou, Jilin

Written as ""
Xinhe, Anhui, in Qingyang County
Xinhe, Hebei, seat of Xinhe County
Xinhe, Hubei, in Hanchuan
Xinhe, Hengyang, in Changning City, Hunan
Xinhe, Pizhou, Jiangsu
Xinhe, Shuyang County, Jiangsu
Xinhe, Shandong, in Pingdu
Xinhe, Shanghai, in Chongming District
Xinhe, Wenling, Zhejiang
Shangxinhe, Nanjing

Townships 
Written as "":
Xinhe Township, Jilin, in Antu County
Xinhe Township, Zhejiang, in Tonglu County

Written as "":
 Xinhe, Huarong, a township of Huarong County, Hunan.
Xinhe Township, Inner Mongolia, in Horqin Left Middle Banner

Waterways 
A branch of Qinhuai River in Nanjing is known as Qinhuai Xinhe (）